The Ramainz were an American tribute band to the Ramones. Its members included Dee Dee Ramone, Marky Ramone, Dee Dee's wife Barbara Zampini, and C. J. Ramone. They were known as The Remains until 1999 but had to change the spelling due to another band already using the name. They released one live album entitled Live in N.Y.C. on 8 October 2002, four months after Dee Dee Ramone's death on 5 June.

Former members
 Dee Dee Ramone – vocals, guitar (1996–2002)
 Marky Ramone – drums (1996–2002)
 Barbara Zampini (Barbara Ramone) – bass, vocals (1996–2002)
 C. J. Ramone – guitar and vocals (1996)
 Ben Trokan (from Marky Ramone and the Intruders) – guitar (1997–2002)

References

Tribute bands
Ramones
American punk rock groups
Musical groups established in 1996
Musical groups disestablished in 2002